North Johnston High School is a public high school in Kenly, North Carolina.

Community
North Johnston High School serves an area composed of several small communities and towns:  Glendale-Chapel, Kenly, Micro, and Pine Level.  Each of these communities had their own local schools until the consolidated North Johnston High School opened in 1965.  The attendance area is heavily influenced by its agriculture heritage.  The economic base has gradually changed over the years, but many of the people in the area are still involved with some agriculture enterprise.  The people in the community have a great deal of pride in the high school, and many are involved in their student's education.  The development of local industry and the opportunities of the Research Triangle Park and Wake County have begun to influence the economic base and have increased more of an awareness of the importance of parental involvement in education.

Faculty
The professional faculty consists of 57 teachers including 2 counselors, 1 student advocate, 1 testing coordinator, 1 career development counselor, 7 exceptional children's teachers, 1 distance learning coordinator, and 1 media specialist.  The administrative staff consists of 1 principal and two assistant principals.  One-fourth of the certified staff has master's degrees and/or post graduate work.  Part-time personnel include a nurse, social worker, speech therapist, and school psychologist.

Academics
North Johnston High School is proud of its emphasis on academic excellence and individual student success and achievement.  The school offers a wide range of upper level honors and advanced placement elective courses in the core curriculum.  Students at North Johnston High School can choose from a total of 32 honors and advanced placement courses combined.  Our school has earned the title “ School of Distinction ” according to the State Department of Public Instruction's Accountability Model for the past three school years.  We have also met AYP during that three-year span per federal law dealing with No Child Left Behind.  Ninety per cent of the graduates of the class of 2006 were accepted into institutions of higher learning with 34% going to four-year colleges.  The remaining 10% chose the military or full-time employment with private business.

Athletic programs
An athletic director, twenty qualified coaches, and one first responder supervise teams in baseball, basketball, cheerleading, cross country, football, golf, soccer, softball, tennis, track and field, volleyball, and wrestling.  A junior varsity program is offered in most sports for underclassmen.  The athletic tradition is rich with one individual state championship (pole vault:Jonathan Arthur) and one team state championship in baseball.  Athletic teams have won numerous conference, district, and regional championships.  North Johnston High School was recognized by the North Carolina High School Athletic Association in 2000 as the state 1A Sportsmanship Award Winner.

Former NJHS football player, Willie Junior Smith (born November 13, 1986) is an American football offensive tackle for the Oakland Raiders of the National Football League (NFL). He was signed by the Washington Redskins as an undrafted free agent in 2011. He played college football for East Carolina University.

References

External links
North Johnston High School web site

Public high schools in North Carolina
Schools in Johnston County, North Carolina